John A. Greason (July 29, 1851 – July 22, 1889) was an American professional baseball player from Washington, D.C. who pitched a total of seven games for the  Washington Blue Legs of the National Association of Professional Base Ball Players.  In his short one-season career, he started and completed all seven of his games, had a 1–6 win–loss record and a 5.86 ERA.

References

External links

Major League Baseball pitchers
19th-century baseball players
Washington Blue Legs players
Baseball players from Washington, D.C.
1851 births
1889 deaths